Ischyromys is an extinct genus of rodent from North America.
 
The 60 cm (2 ft) long creature is one of the oldest rodents known. It resembled a mouse and already had characteristic rodent incisors. Ischyromys'''s hind legs were longer than the forelegs, which could be used for other means than walking. Unlike most other mammals of its time, Ischyromys was probably arboreal (along with its relative Paramys''). It was a well-adapted climber that gradually beat out competition from rodent-like arboreal plesiadapiform primates.

References

Eocene rodents
Oligocene rodents
Eocene animals of North America
Oligocene animals of North America
White River Fauna
Prehistoric rodent genera